Ashok Pati is an Indian Odia and Bengali and Bangladesh  screenplay, story writer, actor and director.

Filmography 
Assistant director (Odia)
 Rakhi Bhijigala Akhi Luhare
 Suna Palinki
 Laxmi Pratima
 Kie Pochhi Daba Maa Akhira Luha
 Sahara Jaluchhi
 Mana Rahigala Tumari Thare
Assistant director (Hindi)
 Dhai Akshar prem ki
 Chori Chori
 Deewaar: Let's Bring Our Heroes Home
 Taxi no 9211
 Shohorat tv serial ( DD - 1 )

Director

 
   
Television
Shohrat .. Hindi .. DD1
Sanskara .. Odia .. ETv odia
Sihaga Sindura.. odia .. Star Kiran ,odia

Screenplay/Story
 Baazi (2005)
 Mu Tate Love Karuchi (2007)
 Mate Ta Love Helare (2008)
 Nandini I Love U (2008)
 Prem Rogi (2009)
 Dream Girl (2009)
 Sanju Aau Sanjana (2010)
 Diwana (2010)
 Loafer (2011)
 143 - I Love You (2011)
 Dosti (2011)
 Shapath (2012)
 Idiot: I Do Ishq Only Tumse (2012)
 Deewana Deewani (2013)

Actor
 Prema Adhei Akshyara (2010)
 Idiot: I Do Ishq Only Tumse (2012)
 Luchakali (2012)

Controversies 
In 2021, Pati and Zee Sarthak Films Pvt. Ltd. were accused of remaking Helen into Odia, without buying rights from the original creators due to which Boney Kapoor's Production house sued them and the telecast of "Monalisa" (the Odia remake) was cancelled on Zee Sarthak TV.

References

External links 
 Ashok Pati in Gomolo
 

Living people
Indian male screenwriters
Film directors from Odisha
Bengali film directors
Odia screenwriters
Odia film directors
Bengali screenwriters
Indian Hindus
21st-century Indian film directors
Screenwriters from Odisha
Odia film screenwriters
1976 births